The Rainmaker is a play written by N. Richard Nash in the early 1950s.  The play opened on October 28, 1954, at the Cort Theatre in New York City, and ran for 125 performances.  It was directed by Joseph Anthony and produced by Ethel Linder Reiner.

The play was translated into more than 40 languages and made into the 1956 film The Rainmaker, starring Burt Lancaster and Katharine Hepburn. The story was also made into a Broadway musical, 110 in the Shade. The play was revived on Broadway in 1999–2000 starring Woody Harrelson and Jayne Atkinson, who was nominated for the 2000 Tony Award for Best Actress in a Play.

Plot summary
Set in a drought-ridden rural town in the West in Depression-era America, the play tells the story of a pivotal hot summer day in the life of spinsterish Lizzie Curry. Lizzie keeps house for her father and two brothers on the family cattle ranch. She has just returned from a trip to visit pseudo-cousins (all male), which was undertaken with the failed expectation that she would find a husband. As their farm languishes under the devastating drought, Lizzie's family worries about her marriage prospects more than about their dying cattle. A charming confidence trickster named Starbuck arrives and promises to bring rain in exchange for $100.  His arrival sets off a series of events that enable Lizzie to see herself in a new light.

Critical reception
The reviews called the play "Stirring" (Newsday), "captivating" (The New York Times), "wonderfully funny" (New York Daily News), and a "classic" (Chicago Sun-Times).

Original cast list
Lizzie Curry – Geraldine Page
File – Richard Coogan
Bill Starbuck – Darren McGavin
H.C. Curry – Cameron Prud'Homme
Sheriff Thomas – Tom Flatley Reynolds
Jim Curry – Albert Salmi
Noah Curry – Joseph Sullivan

In Popular Culture
In "Fonzie is a Thespian," episode 7 of the seventh season of Happy Days, The Rainmaker is presented by an unspecified community theatre in Milwaukee, Wisconsin, with Marion Cunningham as Lizzie and Fonzie as Bill Starbuck.

References

External links
 

Footlights Discussion group: Information about the play
Review of the 1954 production
Review of the 1999 revival
Another review of the 1999 revival
Review of another revival
The Rainmaker at ThatTheatreSite Provides character info, updated audition listings, and additional resources.

1954 plays
Broadway plays
Comedy plays
Great Depression plays
American plays adapted into films
Plays by N. Richard Nash
Plays set in the United States
Western United States in fiction